Maurice James McHugh (19 February 1917 – 25 September 2010) was a New Zealand rugby union player who played for the All Blacks in 1946 and 1949; he was the 458th All Black.

Early life 
He was educated at Sacred Heart College, Auckland, and later played for the Auckland Marist club. He was the national amateur heavyweight boxing champion in 1938.

All Blacks 
He was a forward for the All Blacks 15 times, including two tests (1946) against Australia and one (1949) against South Africa.

When he died aged 93 in Auckland in 2010, he was the oldest living All Black (a distinction that then went to Fred Allen).

References
Oldest All Black McHugh dies (New Zealand Herald)

1917 births
2010 deaths
Rugby union players from Auckland
People educated at Sacred Heart College, Auckland
New Zealand rugby union players
New Zealand international rugby union players
Auckland rugby union players
Rugby union locks
Rugby union number eights
Rugby union flankers
New Zealand male boxers